This is the list of populated places in Serbia (excluding Kosovo), as recorded by the 2002 census, sorted alphabetically by municipalities. Settlements denoted as "urban" (towns and cities) are marked bold. Population for every settlement is given in brackets. The same list in alphabetic order is in List of populated places in Serbia (alphabetic).

A

Ada

Aleksandrovac

Aleksinac

Alibunar

Apatin

Aranđelovac

Arilje

B

Babušnica

Bač

Bačka Palanka

Bačka Topola

Bački Petrovac

Bajina Bašta

Barajevo

Batočina

Bečej

Bela Crkva

Bela Palanka

Beočin

Blace

Bogatić

Bojnik

Boljevac

Bor

Bosilegrad

Brus

Bujanovac

C

Crna Trava

Č

Čačak

Čajetina

Čoka

Čukarica

Ć

Ćićevac

Ćuprija

D

Despotovac

Dimitrovgrad

Doljevac

G

Gadžin Han

Golubac

Gornji Milanovac

Grocka

I

Inđija

Irig

Ivanjica

J

Jagodina

K

Kanjiža

Kikinda

Kladovo

Knić

Knjaževac

Koceljeva

Kosjerić

Kovačica

Kovin

Kraljevo

Kragujevac

Krupanj

Kruševac

Kučevo

Kula

Kuršumlija

L

Lajkovac

Lapovo

Lazarevac

Lebane

Leskovac

Loznica

Lučani

Lj

Ljig

Ljubovija

M

Majdanpek

Mali Iđoš

Mali Zvornik

Malo Crniće

Medveđa

Merošina

Mionica

Mladenovac

N

Negotin

Niš

Niška Banja

Nova Crnja

Nova Varoš

Novi Bečej

Novi Kneževac

Novi Pazar

Novi Sad

O

Obrenovac

Odžaci

Opovo

Osečina

P

Palilula

Pančevo

Paraćin

Pećinci

Petrovac na Mlavi

Petrovaradin

Pirot

Plandište

Požarevac

Požega

Preševo

Priboj

Prijepolje

Prokuplje

R

Rača

Raška

Ražanj

Rekovac

Ruma

S

Sečanj

Senta

Sjenica

Smederevo

Smederevska Palanka

Sokobanja

Sombor

Sopot

Srbobran

Sremska Mitrovica

Sremski Karlovci

Stara Pazova

Stari Grad, Belgrade

Subotica

Surdulica

Svilajnac

Svrljig

Š

Šabac

Šid

T

Temerin

Titel

Topola

Trgovište

Trstenik

Tutin

U

Ub

Užice

V

Valjevo

Varvarin

Velika Plana

Veliko Gradište

Vladičin Han

Vladimirci

Vlasotince

Voždovac

Vranje

Vrbas

Vrnjačka Banja

Vršac

Z

Zaječar

Zemun

Zrenjanin

Ž

Žabalj

Žabari

Žagubica

Žitište

Žitorađa

See also
Administrative divisions of Serbia
Districts of Serbia
Municipalities and cities of Serbia
Cities and towns of Serbia
 Cities, towns and villages of Vojvodina

References
 Popis stanovništva, domaćinstava i Stanova 2002. Knjiga 1: Nacionalna ili etnička pripadnost po naseljima. Republički zavod za statistiku, Beograd, Srbija, 2003.

External links

Serbia

Populated Places